This is a list of populated places in Rivers State, Nigeria. It is not complete but includes the most populated cities, towns and villages.

Abalama
Abonnema
Afam
Ahoada
Andoni 
Ataba
Bane
Bonny
Bori
Bille
Bodo
Buguma
Degema Town
Eberi 
Elele
Emohua
Igrita
Igwuruta
Igbo-Etche 
Kula
Mbiama
Nkoro
Odiabidi
Okehi
Okobie
Okoloma
Okomoko
Okrika
Omoku
Onne
Opobo
Oyorokoto
Oyigbo
Port Harcourt (capital and largest city)
Rumuokoro
Umuagbai
Umuru 
Usokun-Degema
Unyeada Kingdom

See also
List of villages in Rivers State

External links
Directory of Cities and Towns in Rivers State

Rivers State-related lists
 
Rivers State, List of cities in
Rivers State